Jan Björkman, is a Swedish social democratic politician, member of the Riksdag from 1988 to 2010. From 2006 to 2010, he was First Vice Speaker of the Riksdag.

External links 
Riksdagen: Jan Björkman (s)
Jan Björkman – www.socialdemokraterna.se

Living people
Members of the Riksdag from the Social Democrats
Members of the Riksdag 2002–2006
Year of birth missing (living people)
Members of the Riksdag 1988–1991
Members of the Riksdag 1991–1994
Members of the Riksdag 1998–2002
Members of the Riksdag 2006–2010
20th-century Swedish politicians
21st-century Swedish politicians